Talwalkar is an Indian surname. It may refer to:

Abhi Talwalkar (born 1964), Indian businessman, was president and CEO of LSI Corporation
Govind Talwalkar (1925–2017), Indian journalist, editor and author
Hemant Talwalkar (1954–2016), Indian cricketer
Jayshree Talwalkar, also known as Didi, Indian philosopher, spiritual leader, social reformer
Padma Talwalkar (born 1949), Indian classical vocalist
Sharad Talwalkar (1918–2001), Indian film, television and stage actor in Marathi Film Industry and Theatre
Smita Talwalkar (1954–2014), Indian Marathi film actress, producer and director
Sulekha Talwalkar, Indian Marathi film, television and theatre actress
Suresh Talwalkar (born 1948), Indian musician

See also
Talwalkars, Indian large chain of health clubs